Empress Liu (劉皇后, personal name unknown,  404) was an empress of the short-lived Chinese state Chu. Her husband was Chu's only emperor, Huan Xuan (Emperor Wudao).

She was the great-granddaughter of the Jin official Liu Qiao, and her father Liu Dan (劉耽) was also an official. She married Huan Xuan before he became a major warlord, although the exact time is not known. After Huan Xuan seized the throne from Emperor An of Jin in 403, he created her empress in spring 404. She was described as someone with good judgement of character, and she, suspecting the intentions of the general Liu Yu, told Huan Xuan that Liu Yu would not be his subordinate long and should be killed. Huan Xuan refused. Later in 404, however, Liu Yu started an uprising that eventually forced Huan Xuan from the capital Jiankang and led to his downfall and death. Empress Liu's fate is unknown.

References

 Zizhi Tongjian, vol. 113.

Sixteen Kingdoms empresses
Huan Chu people